Arrell Morgan Gibson (1921–1987) was a historian and author specializing in the history of the state of Oklahoma. 

Gibson was born in Pleasanton, Kansas on December 1, 1921.  He earned degrees from Missouri Southern State College and the University of Oklahoma.  He is best known for writing Oklahoma: A History of Five Centuries (University of Oklahoma Press 1965, 1981) and The Oklahoma Story (University of Oklahoma Press 1978). He died in Norman, Oklahoma on November 30, 1987. There have been two literary awards created in Gibson's honor.  The Oklahoma Center For The Book grants its Arrell Gibson Lifetime Achievement Award annually to an Oklahoman for a body of literary work.
The Indian Territory Posse of Westerners International awards a $500 cash prize annually to the year's best essay on the history of Native Americans.

Academic career 

He received his  B.A. from Missouri Southern State College in 1946,
his M.A. from University of Oklahoma in 1948
and his Ph.D. from University of Oklahoma in 1954.

He was Professor of History and Government at Phillips University, Enid, Oklahoma – 1949–1957.
He was the George Lynn Cross Research Professor of History at University of Oklahoma – 1957–?

He was Curator: Western History Collections at University of Oklahoma – 1957–1970.
Curator: Sam Noble Oklahoma Museum of Natural History (then called the Stovall Museum) at University of Oklahoma – 1960–1987.

He was visiting professor at University of New Mexico in 1975
He was visiting distinguished professor; Graduate Studies Consultant – University of South China – 1985.
He was Goldwater Distinguished Professor of American Institutions – Arizona State University – 1986

Honors 
 Research Grant – American Philosophical Society
 Research Grant – Duke Foundation
 Research Grant – University of Oklahoma
 Rockefeller Foundation Award
 Oklahoma Writer of the Year Award from the University of Oklahoma School of Journalism
 American Association for State and Local History Award of Merit for his book Wilderness Bonanza
 Oklahoma Hall of Fame Award
 University of Oklahoma's Distinguished Citation Award
 Honorary Doctorate – University of South China
 Honorary Doctorate – College of Idaho
 Board Member – Oklahoma Historical Society
 Board Member – Museum of the Great Plains
 Board Member – Mississippi Choctaw Cultural Center
 First President – Oklahoma Center for the Book
 President Elect – Western History Association

Books 
 The Kickapoos (1963)
 The Life and Death of Colonel Albert Jennings Fountain (1965)
 Oklahoma: A History of Five Centuries (1965)
 The Chickasaws (1971) which placed second for a Pulitzer Prize online
 Wilderness Bonanza (1972)
 The West in the Life of the Nation (1976) online
 The Oklahoma Story (1978)
 The American Indian: Pre-History to the Present (1980) online
 The Santa Fe and Taos Colonies: Age of the Muses 1900–1942 (1983)
 editor – The West Wind Blows: The Autobiography of Edward Everett Dale (1984)
 editor – Between Two Worlds: The Survival of Twentieth Century Indians (1986)
 Yankees in paradise : the Pacific Basin frontier (1993) ed. by John Whitehead online

References 

Writers from Oklahoma
Missouri Southern State University alumni
University of Oklahoma alumni
1921 births
1987 deaths
Arizona State University faculty
Phillips University faculty
University of Oklahoma faculty
20th-century American historians
American male non-fiction writers
People from Pleasanton, Kansas
20th-century American male writers